Rede Ghumat is a historical monument in Banda town, nowadays well known for its trade in Sindhudurg district of Maharashtra state in western India. Banda, also known for its rich and varied heritage. This town possesses myriad types of monuments within it. One of them is Rede Ghumat.

This art is structured with one ghumat (dome), that is why this built is termed as 'Rede ghumat'. In its early period it was famous as ‘Yadgir Khijar’ during Adilshaha. These Ghumat were built in between 16th century. History suggests that, the first Subhedar of Adilshaha named ‘Pirkhan’ had built this Ghumat.

The height of these Ghumat (dome) is nearly 250 feet. The agricultural land which is spread near ‘'Rede Ghumat’ is called as ‘Chaman’ meaning the garden of flowers. During Adilshaha’s time, the flowers from this garden were sent to Vijapur with the help of Income tax traveler ‘Khandani Swar’.

This Ghumat is still in good condition but is far from development. Some part of this building has started to collapse. Village Grampanchayat is very well aware of this and has taken some serious decision in order to preserve this monument. Many villagers are also very keen in this business but they still lacking some money problems. And now it is a need of everyone to preserve this historic art. Lets preserve this great art...

Tourist attractions in Sindhudurg district